San Bernardo is the name of two villages in the Mexican state of Hidalgo.

One is located at 
One is located at

References

Populated places in Hidalgo (state)